Santo Antônio de Posse is a municipality in the state of São Paulo in Brazil. It is part of the Metropolitan Region of Campinas. The population is 23,529 (2020 est.) in an area of 154.13 km2. The elevation is 695 m. Nearby cities are Jaguariuna, Campinas, Americana, Holambra, Amparo, Serra Negra, Artur Nogueira, Mogi Mirim, Mogi Guacu, Cosmopolis, Espirito Santo do Pinhal.

References

External links 
 City Hall

Municipalities in São Paulo (state)